Belle Creek is a stream in Meeker County, in the U.S. state of Minnesota. It is a tributary of the Crow River.

Belle Creek bears the name of a pioneer farmer.

See also
List of rivers of Minnesota

References

Rivers of Meeker County, Minnesota
Rivers of Minnesota